The Big Four Conference was an IHSAA-sanctioned conference that lasted from 1954 to 1971. The four denotes the counties that the schools hailed from (Boone, Hendricks, Montgomery, and Putnam counties). The Montgomery County Conference folded into the B4C in 1966, temporarily turning it into a 15-team superconference. However, with consolidations hitting Montgomery and Putnam counties hard, the conference folded five years later, as the Montgomery County schools folded into North Montgomery and Southmont High Schools, leaving only three schools.

Members

 Was Jackson Township until 1956.
 Concurrent with B4C and NCC 1955-65.

References

Indiana high school athletic conferences
High school sports conferences and leagues in the United States